Aleksandr Mikhailovich Dobroskok (born 12 June 1982) is a Russian diver who competed in the 2000 Summer Olympics and in the 2004 Summer Olympics.

He won a silver medal in the 3 m Springboard Synchronized event at the 2000 Summer Olympics with his partner Dmitri Sautin.

In the 2003 World Championships in Barcelona, he won gold in both 3m individual, and 3m synchro (with Dmitri Sautin).  He also won the 2009 European championships on 3m.

His younger brother Dmitriy Dobroskok is also an international diver.

External links 
 Profile

1982 births
Living people
People from Buzuluk, Orenburg Oblast
Russian male divers
Olympic divers of Russia
Divers at the 2000 Summer Olympics
Divers at the 2004 Summer Olympics
Divers at the 2008 Summer Olympics
Olympic silver medalists for Russia
Olympic medalists in diving
Medalists at the 2000 Summer Olympics
World Aquatics Championships medalists in diving
Sportspeople from Orenburg Oblast